St. Francis Xavier School, Kolkata, India, is a school running classes from Class I - Class XII. The school is located in Salt Lake City, India and is situated opposite the Hyatt Regency Kolkata and the Salt Lake Stadium.
For admissions in the pre-school and 2+ to 5+ of age groups, students get admitted to its another school, St. Francis International School.

About School
St. Francis Xavier School is co-educational with English as a medium of instruction. The normal entry point is in the Play Group at the age of 2+. Pupils are prepared to take the Indian Certificate of Secondary Education (ICSE) and later, the Indian School Certificate (ISC) Examinations. 

The school is affiliated to the Council for Indian School Certificate Examinations(CISCE). ICSE and ISC examinations are held at the Class X and Class XII levels.

Academics
The School prepares its students to appear in the Indian School Certificate Examination (ICSE) at the Class X level and Indian School Certificate (ISC) examination in the class XII level.

See also
Education in India
List of schools in India
Education in West Bengal

References

External links
Official website

Primary schools in West Bengal
High schools and secondary schools in Kolkata
Educational institutions established in 1982
1982 establishments in West Bengal